Kate Martin may refer to:

Kate Martin (jurist), director of the Center for National Security Studies
Kate Martin (All My Children), fictional character in the American TV soap opera All My Children
Kathy Mershon, fictional character in All My Children, born Kate Louise Martin, great-granddaughter of Kate Martin
Kate Martin (musician), Australian singer-songwriter

See also
Catherine Martin (disambiguation)